Liftwood is an unincorporated community in New Castle County, Delaware, United States. Liftwood is located southwest of the intersection of Shipley Road and Weldin Road, northeast of Wilmington.

References 

Unincorporated communities in New Castle County, Delaware
Unincorporated communities in Delaware